Miguel Ángel Conicelli (born 21 January 1995) is an Argentine professional footballer who plays as a central midfielder.

Career
Conicelli started in the youth set-up of local team Deportivo Villa, before signing for Platense's academy; which was split into two stints due to a short spell with Kimberley. His first appearance in senior football came in a Primera B Metropolitana win away to Deportivo Armenio on 6 November 2014. Eleven appearances followed for the club across four seasons, two of which came in the 2017–18 campaign which Platense ended with promotion as champions to Primera B Nacional. In June 2018, Conicelli remained in the third tier after agreeing a move to Colegiales. He was sent off during his second match against UAI Urquiza on 29 August.

Career statistics
.

Honours
Platense
Primera B Metropolitana: 2017–18

References

External links

1995 births
Living people
People from Hurlingham Partido
Argentine footballers
Association football midfielders
Primera B Metropolitana players
Club Atlético Platense footballers
Club Atlético Colegiales (Argentina) players
Sportspeople from Buenos Aires Province